Nancy Jacobs (born October 27, 1951 in West Virginia) is a former Maryland State Senator representing District 34.

Early life, education, and early career
Jacobs attended Bridgeport High School in Bridgeport, West Virginia. After high school, she attended West Virginia University, where she graduated in 1973 with her B.S. in journalism and speech.

After college, she began her career at WSLS-TV in Roanoke, Virginia. She became the owner and operator of West Shore Indoor Tennis Club, Edgewood, Maryland where she worked until 1984. Then in 1985, Jacobs became the communications coordinator for the Maryland Concerned Women for America . She was also a realtor from 1987 until 1991.

Maryland House of Delegates

Elections
In 1994, incumbent Republican State Delegate David R. Craig decided to retire in order to run for a seat in the Maryland Senate. Jacobs ran and ranked first place with 23% of the vote. The other two candidates who won the district were incumbent Democrats Rose Mary Hatem Bonsack (23%) and Mary Louise Preis (22%). In 1998, she decided to retire after one term to run for a seat in the State Senate.

Tenure
She was Minority Deputy Whip from 1997 until 1999.

Committee assignments
House Judiciary Committee

Maryland Senate

Elections
Nancy Jacobs was first elected to the Maryland State Senate in 1999 to represent District 34, which covers portions of Harford and Cecil County, Maryland. In 1998, she won the seat vacated by fellow Republican David R. Craig, who was the State Senator for District 34 for only four years. Jacobs won a close election against Democratic challenger and former fellow Delegate Mary Louise Preis, whom she only defeated by 139 votes out of over 37,000 votes cast.

In 2002, the election was a different story. This time she won with over 60% of the vote, defeating Democrat Arthur Henry Helton, Jr. The election in 2006 was a little closer. That year she defeated Democrat William B. Kilby with 57% of the vote. In 2013 Jacobs declared to her supporters that she would not run for re-election in 2014.

Tenure
During the 2007 session of the Maryland General Assembly, Senator Jacobs sponsored Maryland's version of Jessica's Law. Her bill was passed by a 139–0 vote in the House and 43–3 in the Senate and has been signed into law by the Governor.

She was elected Senate Minority Whip in 2009 and was the first woman in Maryland history to become the Senate Minority Leader in 2011. She retired from the Senate in 2015

Committee assignments
Judicial Proceedings Committee
Joint Committee on Children, Youth, and Families
Joint Oversight Committee on the Department of Juvenile Services

2012 congressional election

After redistricting, Jacobs decided to run in the newly redrawn Maryland's 2nd congressional district and challenge incumbent Democratic U.S. Congressman Dutch Ruppersberger. She won the Republican primary in April with 62% of the vote. Ruppersberger defeated her 66%-31%.

Electoral history
2006 Race for Maryland State Senate – District 34
{| class="wikitable"
|-
!Name
!Votes
!Percent
!Outcome
|-
|- 
|Nancy Jacobs, Rep.
|21,601
|  57.3%
|   Won
|-
|- 
|William B. Kilby, Dem.
|16,108
|  42.7%
|   Lost
|-
|Other Write-Ins
|18
|  0.0%
|   Lost
|}

2002 Race for Maryland State Senate – District 34
{| class="wikitable"
|-
!Name
!Votes
!Percent
!Outcome
|-
|- 
|Nancy Jacobs, Rep.
|20,474
|  60.4%
|   Won
|-
|- 
|Arthur Henry Helton, Jr., Dem.
|13,399
|  39.5%
|   Lost
|-
|Other Write-Ins
|45
|  0.1%
|   Lost
|}

1998 Race for Maryland State Senate – District 34
{| class="wikitable"
|-
!Name
!Votes
!Percent
!Outcome
|-
|- 
|Nancy Jacobs, Rep.
|18,996
|  50%
|   Won
|-
|- 
|Mary Louise Preis, Dem.
|18,857
|  50%
|   Lost
|-
|Other Write-Ins
|45
|  0.1%
|   Lost
|}

1994 Race for Maryland House of Delegates – District 34
Voters choose three:
{| class="wikitable"
|-
!Name
!Votes
!Percent
!Outcome
|-
|- 
|Nancy Jacobs, Rep.
|18,091
|  20%
|   Won
|-
|- 
|Rose Mary Hatem Bonsack, Dem.
|17,762
|  20%
|   Won
|-
|- 
|Mary Louise Preis, Dem.
|17,380
|  19%
|   Won
|-
|- 
|B. Daniel Riley, Dem.
|13,891
|  15%
|   Lost
|-
|- 
|Scott Williams, Rep.
|12,362
|  14%
|   Lost
|-
|- 
|Kenneth A. Thompson, Rep.
|10,576
|  12%
|   Lost
|}

References

External links
 
 http://www.msa.md.gov/msa/mdmanual/05sen/html/msa12249.html
 http://www.nancyjacobs.com/site/
 Nancy Jacobs for Congress

Republican Party Maryland state senators
Republican Party members of the Maryland House of Delegates
1951 births
Living people
People from Edgewood, Maryland
Politicians from Charleston, West Virginia
Women state legislators in Maryland
West Virginia University alumni
21st-century American politicians
21st-century American women politicians
20th-century American politicians
20th-century American women politicians
Candidates in the 2012 United States elections